These lists of cargo ships document freighters engaged in the transportation goods. They include ships which carry small numbers of passengers in addition to their primary freight cargo.

By flag 
 List of Bangladesh-flagged cargo ships
 List of Greece-flagged cargo ships
 List of Liberia-flagged cargo ships
 List of Malta-flagged cargo ships
 List of Panama-flagged cargo ships
 List of Russia-flagged cargo ships

By type 
 List of bulk carriers
 List of container ships

See also 
 List of cruise ships

Lists of ships